Thomas Hussey (born 25 January 1936) is an Irish former Fianna Fáil politician. He was a Teachta Dála (TD) from 1969 to 1981, and then a Senator from 1981 to 1993.

From County Galway, he was a farmer, auctioneer and insurance representative before entering politics. He stood unsuccessfully as a Fianna Fáil candidate for Dáil Éireann in the Galway East constituency at the 1964 by-election and in the 1965 general election. Hussey won a seat in the new Galway North-East constituency at the 1969 general election, and held it until the constituency was abolished in 1977. He then secured election in the re-created Galway East at the 1977 general election, but lost there in 1981. He stood again at the next three general elections, but never returned to the Dáil. He served as Minister of State at the Department of Agriculture from 1977 to 1980; and Minister of State at the Department of Social Welfare and Minister of State at the Department of Health from 1980 to 1981.

However, after his 1981 defeat he was elected to the 15th Seanad Éireann by the Agricultural Panel, and held that seat until his defeat in the 1993 Seanad election to the 20th Seanad, when he retired from politics.

References

1936 births
Living people
Fianna Fáil TDs
Members of the 15th Seanad
Members of the 16th Seanad
Members of the 17th Seanad
Members of the 18th Seanad
Members of the 19th Seanad
Members of the 19th Dáil
Members of the 20th Dáil
Members of the 21st Dáil
Local councillors in County Galway
Politicians from County Galway
Ministers of State of the 21st Dáil
Fianna Fáil senators